Jussara Freire (Campo Grande, February 8, 1951) is a Brazilian actress.

References

External links

1951 births
Living people
Brazilian television actresses
Brazilian telenovela actresses
Brazilian film actresses
Brazilian stage actresses